James Vaughan may refer to:

James Vaughan (priest), Dean of Achonry, Ireland, from 1662 to 1683
James David Vaughan (1864–1941), American musician
James Churchill Vaughan (1893–1937), Nigerian physician
James H. Vaughan (1934–1996), Canadian politician
James T. Vaughn (1925-2007), American politician
Jimmie Vaughan (born 1951), American musician
James Vaughan (footballer, born 1986), English right-back
James Vaughan (footballer, born 1988), English footballer for Tranmere Rovers
James Vaughan (police officer), chief constable of Dorset Police